Canterbury Christian School is a private, classical Christian school and member of the Anglican School Association. It is located in Los Altos, California and serves students from Kindergarten to Fifth Grade.

History
Founded in 1974 by retired US Navy Lieutenant commander Reverend Norman Randall Milbank. Prior to establishing Canterbury Rev. Milbank was the Bursar at Stanford University.

Academics
Canterbury offers a Classical liberal arts education from a traditional Christian perspective. Students study English as well as Latin and Greek using "traditional methods" such as phonics for teaching reading and cursive for penmanship from Abeka and Memoria Press. Math instruction is based on frequent cumulative review and employs material from Saxon Math and Singapore Math.

Technology philosophy
Canterbury has been popular with some Silicon Valley parents working in the technology sector in the United States, including those from some of the most advanced technology firms such as Google, Facebook, and VMware.  Their low-tech approach has been featured internationally by the German News Agency (DPA) and Taiwan-based online newspaper Apple Daily.

Spirituality
Canterbury is the parish school of Saint Paul's Anglican Church, Los Altos. Student enrollment is open to Christian and non-Christian families. Daily chapel services are based on the Anglican Book of Common Prayer.

Notable alumni
J. Derek Halvorson, President of Covenant College

References

External links
 School website
 Anglican School Association Website

Classical Christian schools
Schools in Santa Clara County, California
Los Altos, California
Private elementary schools in California
Educational institutions established in 1974
1974 establishments in California